Eládio Taboas Clímaco (born 27 October 1941, in Lisbon) is a Portuguese television presenter best known for hosting Festival da Canção, Jeux Sans Frontières, commentating on the Eurovision Song Contest for RTP viewers, and providing voice narration for many television documentaries.

Career
After several years of training in theatre and cinema, Clímaco joint RTP in 1972 and began hosting the entertainment show Domingo à Noite which was broadcast from Teatro Maria Matos. In 1976 Clímaco began hosting Festival da Canção (Portuguese hits for the Eurovision Song Contest), he also presented Jeux Sans Frontières for Portuguese viewers from 1979 until 1997 and commented on the Eurovision Song Contest for RTP viewers between 1976 and 2006 on 14 occasions, during the presentation of the Dutch televote in the Eurovision Song Contest 2006, Clímaco didn't translate properly the gay remarks televote presenter Paul de Leeuw gave to presenter Sakis Rouvas and said "he was saying that they really look like Greeks".

In recent years Clímaco has still remained associate with RTP, in 2006 he participated in Dança Comigo (Portuguese counterpart of the UK's Strictly Come Dancing) and in 2007 he participated in the Golden Anniversary programme to celebrate 50 Years of RTP.

Currently he is a presenter on RTP Memória.

References

External links
 

1941 births
Living people
Portuguese agnostics
Portuguese television presenters
Portuguese game show hosts
Portugal in the Eurovision Song Contest